The Standing Buffalo Dakota Nation is a Dakota First Nations band government in southern Saskatchewan, Canada. The band controls a reserve at Standing Buffalo 78.

History

The band is named after Chief Standing Buffalo (Tatankanaje / Tataƞka Najiƞ), who succeeded his father as hereditary chief in 1871. His people were given permission to farm north of the Qu'Appelle Lakes, and their reserve was created in 1881. Despite only being allotted 80 acres per family, rather than the typical 640, the band became prosperous. By 1901, all households were considered self-sufficient. In 1907, the community's agricultural prosperity was wiped out by the revocation of government-owned hay land. The band's demands for an increase in acreage were not heard until 1956.

References

First Nations in Saskatchewan